The 2009 Hamilton Tiger-Cats season was the 52nd season for the team in the Canadian Football League and their 60th overall. The Tiger-Cats finished the season in second place in the East Division with a 9–9 record and qualified for the Grey Cup playoffs for the first time since 2004.

Off-season

CFL draft 
The 2009 CFL Draft took place on May 2, 2009. The Tiger-Cats selected tackle Simeon Rottier from the University of Alberta first overall. They originally also had the third overall pick as well but traded that to the BC Lions for sixth and thirteenth overall picks so the Lions could select their desired player, Jamall Lee.

Transactions

Preseason

Regular season

Season standings

Season schedule

Roster

Playoffs

Schedule

Bracket

*= Team won in Overtime.

East Semi-Final 
Date and time: Sunday, November 15, 1:00 PM Eastern Standard TimeVenue: Ivor Wynne Stadium, Hamilton, Ontario

References

Hamilton Tiger-Cats seasons
Hamilton